Anne Jackson (1926–2016) was an American actress.

Anne or Ann Jackson may also refer to:

Anne Constance Jackson (1889–1928), British amateur ornithologist
Anne Cluysenaar (1936–2014), Belgian-born poet with married name Anne Jackson
Anne Jackson (author) (born 1980), American author
Ann Fletcher Jackson (1833–1903), New Zealand quaker evangelist
Ann Maria Jackson (1810–1880), enslaved woman who escaped along the Underground Railroad

See also
Annie Jackson (disambiguation)
Jackson (name)